Jagdish Singh Rana (28 August 1954 – 19 April 2021) was a member of the 15th Lok Sabha of India. He represented the Saharanpur constituency of Uttar Pradesh as a member of the Bahujan Samaj Party. He joined the Bharatiya Janata Party (BJP) in May 2016 ahead of the 2017 Uttar Pradesh Legislative elections.

Personal life
Rana was born in Muradnagar of Saharanpur district to Harkesh Singh Rana and Krishna Devi on 28 August 1954. He received his Bachelor of Arts degree from J.V. Jain College, Saharanpur, Uttar Pradesh. He married Santosh Rana on 28 May 1972, with whom he has two sons and a daughter.

Rana died on 19 April 2021, from a COVID-19-related illness.

Elections contested

References

External links
Official biographical sketch in Parliament of India website

India MPs 2009–2014
1954 births
2021 deaths
Bahujan Samaj Party politicians
Bahujan Samaj Party candidates in the 2014 Indian general election
Lok Sabha members from Uttar Pradesh
People from Saharanpur district
Deaths from the COVID-19 pandemic in India
Bharatiya Janata Party politicians from Uttar Pradesh